Dzuarikau (Dzuaryqæw) is a village in North Ossetia in Russia. The Dzuarikau–Tskhinvali pipeline, a natural gas corridor leading to South Ossetia, begins at this village. The village is situated on both banks of the Fiagdon River, at the entrance to the Kurtatinsky Gorge. It is located 18 km east of the regional center Alagir and 22 km west of Vladikavkaz, the capital of North Ossetia-Alania.

Geographically, Dzuarikau is located in the Caucasus region of southern Russia. The village is situated at an elevation of approximately 677 metres above sea level and is surrounded by the Caucasus Mountains.

References

Rural localities in North Ossetia–Alania